The first election to North Down and Ards District Council (now Ards and North Down Borough Council), part of the Northern Ireland local elections on 22 May 2014, returned 40 members to the newly formed council via Single Transferable Vote. The Democratic Unionist Party won a plurality of first-preference votes and seats.

Election results

Districts summary

|- class="unsortable" align="centre"
!rowspan=2 align="left"|Ward
! % 
!Cllrs
! %
!Cllrs
! %
!Cllrs
! %
!Cllrs
! %
!Cllrs
! %
!Cllrs
! %
!Cllrs
!rowspan=2|TotalCllrs
|- class="unsortable" align="center"
!colspan=2 bgcolor="" | DUP
!colspan=2 bgcolor="" | UUP
!colspan=2 bgcolor="" | Alliance
!colspan=2 bgcolor="" | Green
!colspan=2 bgcolor="" | TUV
!colspan=2 bgcolor=""| SDLP
!colspan=2 bgcolor="white"| Others
|-
|align="left"|Ards Peninsula
|bgcolor="#D46A4C"|47.1
|bgcolor="#D46A4C"|3
|16.6
|1
|8.1
|1
|0.0
|0
|0.0
|0
|19.1
|1
|9.1
|0
|6
|-
|align="left"|Bangor Central
|bgcolor="#D46A4C"|28.0
|bgcolor="#D46A4C"|2
|15.7
|2
|12.8
|1
|7.6
|1
|4.6
|0
|0.0
|0
|31.3
|0
|6
|-
|align="left"|Bangor East and Donaghadee
|bgcolor="#D46A4C"|32.4
|bgcolor="#D46A4C"|3
|18.9
|1
|9.8
|1
|3.9
|0
|5.3
|0
|0.0
|0
|29.7
|1
|6
|-
|align="left"|Bangor West
|bgcolor="#D46A4C"|31.9
|bgcolor="#D46A4C"|2
|16.2
|1
|17.3
|1
|6.4
|1
|9.1
|0
|4.9
|0
|14.2
|0
|5
|-
|align="left"|Comber
|bgcolor="#D46A4C"|39.2
|bgcolor="#D46A4C"|2
|22.1
|1
|13.2
|1
|0.0
|0
|9.3
|1
|0.0
|0
|16.2
|0
|5
|-
|align="left"|Holywood and Clandeboye
|bgcolor="#D46A4C"|31.9
|bgcolor="#D46A4C"|2
|17.8
|1
|22.2
|1
|14.9
|1
|0.0
|0
|5.0
|0
|8.2
|0
|5
|-
|align="left"|Newtownards
|bgcolor="#D46A4C"|35.7
|bgcolor="#D46A4C"|3
|15.2
|2
|12.7
|1
|0.0
|0
|6.4
|0
|0.0
|0
|30.0
|1
|7
|- class="unsortable" class="sortbottom" style="background:#C9C9C9"
|align="left"| Total
|35.4
|17
|17.4
|9
|13.4
|7
|4.4
|3
|4.8
|1
|4.2
|1
|20.4
|2
|40
|-
|}

District results

Ards Peninsula

2014: 3 x DUP, 1 x SDLP, 1 x UUP, 1 x Alliance

Bangor Central

2014: 2 x DUP, 2 x UUP, 1 x Alliance, 1 x Green

Bangor East and Donaghadee

2014: 3 x DUP, 1 x UUP, 1 x Alliance, 1 x Independent

Bangor West

2014: 2 x DUP, 1 x Alliance, 1 x UUP, 1 x Green

Comber

2014: 2 x DUP, 1 x UUP, 1 x Alliance, 1 x TUV

Holywood and Clandeboye

2014: 2 x DUP, 1 x Alliance, 1 x UUP, 1 x Green

Newtownards

2014: 3 x DUP, 2 x UUP, 1 x Alliance, 1 x Independent

* Incumbent

Changes during the term

† Co-options

‡ Changes of affiliation 

Last update 26 March 2019.

Current composition: see Ards and North Down Borough Council

References

External links
Election results North Down and Ards District Council

2014 Northern Ireland local elections
21st century in County Down
Elections in County Down